Annette Dytrt, also Dytrtová, (born 7 September 1983) is a German former competitive figure skater who also competed internationally for the Czech Republic. She is the 1999 Czech national champion and the 2003–06 German national champion.

Personal life 
Annette Dytrt was born in Landshut, Germany, the daughter of Czech immigrants. She moved to the Czech Republic with her elder sister, Veronika Dytrt, in 2001 but returned to Germany after a year and a half.

Career 
She won the 1999 Czech National Championships under the name Annette Dytrtová.

Dytrt won gold at the German National Figure Skating Championships between 2003 and 2006 and made numerous appearances at the European and World Figure Skating Championships.

In spring 2006, Dytrt tried pair skating with skating partner Norman Jeschke but their partnership was brief and they never competed together in international competition. Dytrt skated in the TV show "Stars auf Eis", a German version of Dancing on Ice, and then returned to competition as a single skater. She was coached by Michael Huth in Oberstdorf.

On 19 May 2011, Dytrt declared her retirement from competitive skating, following the sudden death of a family member.

Since 2013, Dytrt collaborates with Yannick Bonheur in ice shows as an adagio skater.

Programs

Competitive highlights
GP: Grand Prix; JGP: Junior Grand Prix (1997–98 season: Junior Series)

References

External links

 

1983 births
Living people
Sportspeople from Landshut
German female single skaters
Czech female single skaters
German people of Czech descent